Ptychobela resticula is a species of sea snail, a marine gastropod mollusk in the family Pseudomelatomidae, the turrids and allies.

Description
The length of the shell varies between 33 mm and 41.5 mm.

Distribution
This species occurs in the South China Sea

References

 Li B.Q., Kilburn R.N., & Li X.Z. (2010). Report on Crassispirinae Morrison, (Mollusca: Neogastropoda: Turridae) from the China Seas. Journal of Natural History. 44, 699-740.

External links

resticula
Gastropods described in 2010